Park Ji-su (박지수  born 6 December 1998) is a South Korean professional basketball player.

Career

National team

Youth level
Park made her international debut 2012 FIBA Under-17 World Championship in the Netherlands, at age 13. Alongside this, Park participated at the 2014 U-17 World Championship in the Czech Republic, as well as the 2013 and 2015 U-19 World Championships in Lithuania and Russia respectively. Park had a prolific youth career at international tournaments, participating in seven FIBA events, across five years. This was highlighted by two bronze medals at FIBA Asia youth events.

Senior level
Park made her debut with the senior national team, at the 2014 FIBA World Championship for Women in Turkey when she was 15 years old. Park averaged 11 points and 5 five rebounds per game in her senior debut.

WKBL
In 2016, Park began her professional career with the Cheongju KB Stars for the 2016–17 season. In 2017, Park received the WKBL Newcomer Award for the 2016–17 season.

WNBA
In 2018, Park Ji-su was drafted as the seventeenth overall pick by the Minnesota Lynx. After being released by the Lynx, Park was then picked up by the Las Vegas Aces, where she made the final roster and her WNBA debut at age of 19.

In May 2020, Aces announced that Park would sit out the 2020 season to train in South Korea.

Career statistics

WNBA

Regular season

|-
| style="text-align:left;"| 2018
| style="text-align:left;"| Las Vegas
| 32 || 11 || 13.0 || .388 || .000 || .619 || 3.3 || 0.9 || 0.3 || 0.6 || 0.7 || 2.8
|-
| style="text-align:left;"| 2019
| style="text-align:left;"| Las Vegas
| 25 || 0 || 6.5 || .216 || .000 || .444 || 1.1 || 0.4 || 0.2 || 0.2 || 0.3 || 0.8
|-
| style="text-align:left;"| 2021
| style="text-align:left;"| Las Vegas
| 25 || 0 || 8.9 || .327 || .000 || .833 || 1.8 || 0.8 || 0.1 || 0.6 || 0.8 || 2.0
|-
| colspan=2; style="text-align:center;"| Career
| 82 || 11 || 9.8 || .337 || .000 || .667 || 2.2 || 0.7 || 0.2 || 0.5 || 0.6 || 1.9

Playoffs

|-
| style="text-align:left;"| 2019
| style="text-align:left;"| Las Vegas
| 3 || 0 || 4.7 || .200 || – || – || 0.7 || 0.0 || 0.0 || 0.0 || 0.0 || 0.7
|-
| style="text-align:left;"| 2021
| style="text-align:left;"| Las Vegas
| 4 || 0 || 4.0 || .000 || – || .000 || 0.3 || 0.0 || 0.0 || 0.0 || 0.3 || 0.0
|-
| colspan=2; style="text-align:center;"| Career
| 7 || 0 || 4.3 || .125 || – || .000 || 0.4 || 0.0 || 0.0 || 0.0 || 0.1 || 0.3

References

External links

1998 births
Living people
Asian Games medalists in basketball
Asian Games silver medalists for Korea
Basketball players at the 2018 Asian Games
Basketball players at the 2020 Summer Olympics
Medalists at the 2018 Asian Games
Forwards (basketball)
Las Vegas Aces players
Minnesota Lynx draft picks
Olympic basketball players of South Korea
People from Seongnam
South Korean expatriate basketball people in the United States
South Korean women's basketball players
Sportspeople from Gyeonggi Province